The VH1 Trailblazer Honors, also known as the Logo Trailblazer Honors, is the only televised LGBT awards ceremony in the United States. It is an annual awards event founded in 2014 to recognize persons and entities who have made significant contributions towards minority empowerment and civil activism. It has been described as a combined "queer State of the Union, Hall of Fame, and Oscars." The event is aired on Logo TV and VH1.

About 
The VH1 Trailblazer Honors, also known as Logo Trailblazer Honors, is an annually televised awards event, founded in 2014, that recognizes persons and entities who have made significant contributions towards minority empowerment and civil activism. The event is the only LGBT awards ceremony televised in the United States. It has been described as a combined "queer State of the Union, Hall of Fame, and Oscars." In 2018, the event was aired on Logo TV and VH1.

In the 2014 inaugural event, Bill Clinton recognized Edith Windsor and Roberta A. Kaplan for their role in the Defense of Marriage Act. Jason Collins was presented the honor by Lance Bass. Demi Lovato honored cast members of Orange Is the New Black, including Danielle Brooks, Laverne Cox, Lea DeLaria, Taryn Manning, and Samira Wiley. Singer Michael Stipe honored John Abdallah Wambere. Young community leaders were introduced by Daniel Radcliffe. The event included musical performances by Sia, New York City Gay Men's Chorus, A Great Big World, and the band Exousia. The event was attended by celebrities including Joe Manganiello, Ed Sheeran, Jared Leto, Macklemore & Ryan Lewis, Kylie Minogue, Pete Wentz, Ariana Grande, Iggy Azaela, Tegan and Sara, and Laura Jane Grace.

In 2015, Miley Cyrus gave the opening address through a recorded message voicing support for marriage equality and the queer community. Barack Obama gave an address through a video message on the progress of LGBT people. Raven-Symoné and Martin Luther King III were speakers at the event. Musical performances included Adam Lambert and the Bleachers. Other speakers were Laura Jane Grace, Samira Wiley, Tituss Burgess, Tyler Posey, Kelly Osbourne, Betty DeGeneres, Violet Chachki, and Frankie Grande. Jane Fonda, Lily Tomlin, Judith Light, and Ian McKellen were also on stage. This was the first year that the honor "Social Trailblazer" was added. Logo fans voted between four nominees that used social media to advocate for the LGBT community. Nominees included Connor Franta, Joey Graceffa, Jackson Bird, and Gabe Dunn with Franta eventually being named the winner. On behalf of his deceased partner, Bayard Rustin, Walter Naegle accepted the honor. Judy and Dennis Shepard were recognized as "Trailblazing Parents" for co-founding the Matthew Shepard Foundation.

At the 2017 event, musicians, Hayley Kiyoko, Alex Newell, and Wrabel honored Cyndi Lauper with a performance of "True Colors."

The awards given in 2016 took time to remember the 49 victims of the Orlando nightclub shooting.

In 2018, the fifth annual Trailblazer Honors event took place at Cathedral of St. John the Divine, which is one of the first religious institutions in New York City supporting LGBTQ causes. The event was attended by activists and celebrities including Janet Mock, Bebe Rexha, the cast of Pose, and finalist from RuPaul's Drag Race.

Honorees

References

External links 

2014 establishments in the United States
Awards established in 2014
LGBT-related awards
VH1